The 2010 Ontario Scotties Tournament of Hearts wase the 2010 edition of the Ontario provincial women's curling championship. It was held January 4–10 at the Port Arthur Curling Club in Thunder Bay, Ontario. The winning Krista McCarville team represented Ontario at the 2010 Scotties Tournament of Hearts in Sault Ste. Marie, Ontario.

Teams

Standings

Results

Draw 1
January 4, 12:00 PM

Draw 2
January 4, 7:00 PM

Draw 3
January 5, 12:00 PM

Draw 4
January 5, 7:00 PM

Draw 5
January 6, 12:00 PM

Draw 6
January 6, 7:00 PM

Draw 7
January 7, 2:00 PM

Draw 8
January 7, 7:00 PM

Draw 9
January 8, 11:00 AM

Tiebreaker
January 8, 7:00 PM

Playoffs

1 vs. 2
January 9, 2:00 PM

3 vs. 4
January 9, 2:00 PM

Semifinal
January 9, 7:00 PM

Final
January 10, 2:00 PM

Southern Ontario Zones
Regional qualifiers in bold. Two teams qualify from each zone. When only one team enters a zone, then a team from the neighbouring zone also qualifies.  Teams in italics opted to play in the challenge round after being eliminated.

Zone 1
November 21–22 at the Rideau Curling Club

Jenn Hanna (Ottawa)

Zone 2
November 21–22 at the Rideau Curling Club

Cheryl McBain (Rideau)
Ling-Yue Hung (Rideau) [Zone 1 qualifier]
Laura Payne (Rideau) [Zone 4 qualifier]
Katie Morissey (Rideau)
Tracy Samaan (Rideau)

Zone 3
November 28–29 at the Carleton Place Curling Club

Jaimee Gardner (Arnprior) [Zone 4 qualifier]
Nancy Wickham (Carleton Place)
Jennifer Harvey (Renfrew)
Kelly McKenna (Richmond)

Zone 4
December 4–6 at the Land O'Lakes Curling Club (Tweed). No teams entered

Zone 5
November 27–29 at the Haliburton Curling Club

Denna Bagshaw (Cannington)
Kim Lewis (Haliburton)
Julie Cully (Lindsay)
Lisa Farnell (Peterborough)
Angie Melaney (Lakefield)
Marteen Lortie (Peterborough)

Zone 6
December 4–6, Annandale Country Club (Ajax)
Lianne Robertson (Tam Heather)
Christine Pierce (Unionville)

Zone 7
November 28–29, East York Curling Club

Christine Anderson (Leaside)
Julie Hastings (Bayview)
Alison Goring (Bayview)
Colleen Madonia (Thornhill)

Zone 8
November 28-December 2, Mississaugua Golf & Country Club

Megan Hugel (Dixie)
Kathy Brown (High Park)
Jodi McCutcheon (High Park)
Cathy Auld (Mississaugua)

Zone 9
December 4–6, Acton Curling Club
Jacqueline Harrison (Alliston)
Kristy Russell (Orangeville)

Zone 10
November 28–29, Elmvale Curling Club
Tracey Sitts (Parry Sound)
Jennifer Allan (Barrie) [Zone 11 qualifier]
Lynne Middaugh (Orillia)
Sherry Middaugh (Coldwater)
Heather Marshall (Stroud)

Zone 11
December 4–6, Tara Curling Club
Lisa McLean (Paisley)

Zone 12
December 4–6, Arthur & Area Curling Club
Tracey Jones (Arthur)
Sheri Smeltzer (Fergus)
Jenn Spencer (Guelph)
Grace Coyle (Kitchener-Waterloo Granite)

Zone 13
December 5–6, Glendale Golf & Country Club (Hamilton)
Kersti Belshaw (Burlington)
Christine Rettie (Dundas Granite)
Val Stephens-Brockbank (Dundas Granite)
Brit O'Neill (Glendale) [Zone 14 qualifier]

Zone 14
December 4–6, Walkerton Golf & Country Club
Karen Bell (Listowel)

Zone 15
December 4–6, Tavistock Curling Club
Tina Mazerolle (Brant)
Jo-Ann Rizzo (Brant)

Zone 16
December 4–6, Glencoe & District Curling Club
Fiona Muirhead (Ilderton)
Kimberley Tuck (Ilderton)
Carrie Lindner (Sarnia)
Tiffany Anjema (Sarnia)
Amie Shackleton (Ilderton)

Regions 1 & 2
December 11–13, Royal Kingston Curling Club

Regions 3&4
December 11–13, Kitchener-Waterloo Granite Club

Challenge Round
December 18–20, Milton Curling Club

Northern Ontario
The entire region of Northern Ontario had a play down in one event held December 3–6 at the Cochrane Curling Club in Cochrane. The top 4 teams qualified for the Ontario Scotties.

Teams:
Marlo Dahl (Port Arthur)
Krista McCarville (Fort William) [Automatically qualified]
Angela Lee (Port Arthur)
Krista Mayrand (Cochrane)
Oye-Sem Won (Fort William)
Lisa Rouillard (Sudbury)
Dawn Schwar (Sudbury)
Rhonda Skillen (Port Arthur)
MacKenzie Daley (North Bay Granite)
Tracy Horgan (Idylwylde)

B-side play in: Lee 9-5 Daley

C side Qualifier

Final: Horgan 7-3 Dahl

References

External links
Official site

Ontario
Scotties Tournament of Hearts
Ontario Scotties Tournament of Hearts
Sports competitions in Thunder Bay
Ontario Scotties Tournament of Hearts